Club Atlético San Martín, mostly known as San Martín de San Juan, is an Argentine football club from the city of San Juan. The team currently plays in the Argentine Primera B Nacional, the second division of the Argentine football league system.

It was founded on 27 September 1907 and is considered the best club of the San Juan Province.

History
Before 2015, San Martín had only played four seasons in the Argentine top flight. Its first appearance was in the 1970 Nacional championship, finishing bottom of the group after winning only four of 20 games. It again played in the Argentine First Division in the 2007–08 season, being relegated immediately the next season. The squad gained the promotion to the first division for the third time during the 2010–11 season, after beating Gimnasia y Esgrima (LP) 1–0 and later 1–1 on aggregate in the play-off for the second automatic promotion place. The team was relegated during the 2013 Torneo Final.

The team were promoted to the first division in 2014, after finishing 2nd place in the league table. They secured their promotion on the final match-day, when they beat Ferro Carril Oeste 3-0. 

San Martín played in the Argentine First Division from 2015 to 2019. The tournament was expanded to include 30 teams in 2015. It avoided relegation by placing 17th in the 2015 season, 13th in the 2016 season, 22nd in the 2016–17 season, and 18th in the 2017–18 season The team were relegated in the 2018–19 season. Although they finished 21st out of 26, they finished 24th in the average league table for coefficients, meaning they were relegated. 

It currently plays most matches in the Estadio Ingeniero Hilario Sánchez, which has capacity for 19,000 spectators. It sometimes plays major games (notably against Boca Juniors and River Plate) in the Estadio San Juan del Bicentenario, which has capacity for 25,000 spectators.

Uniforms 
Since its foundation, the club has always worn a green and black kit. However, in 2002, they used a lighter-colored green for only one season, going black to the standard green and black.

Players

Current squad
.

Managers
 Dalcio Giovagnini (1999)
 Néstor Craviotto (2000)
 Ricardo Zielinski (2001)
 Roque Alfaro (2005)
 Julio César Toresani (Jan 2005–June 6)
 Gustavo Quinteros (2006–07)
 Fernando Quiroz (2007–08)
 Néstor Craviotto (Jan 2009–June 9)
 Enrique Hrabina (July 2009–March 10)
 Fernando Quiroz (March 2010–June 10)
 Darío Franco (June 2010–March 11)
 Daniel Garnero (March 2011–April 12)
 Facundo Sava (April 2012–Sept 12)
 Gabriel Perrone (Sept 2012–March 13)
 Rubén Forestello (2013–14)
 Carlos Mayor (2015)
 Pablo Lavallén (2015–2016)
 Néstor Gorosito (2016–2018)
 Walter Coyette (2018–2019)
 Alfredo Grelak (2019–2020)

References

External links

Official Twitter 

 
Association football clubs established in 1907
Football clubs in San Juan Province, Argentina
1907 establishments in Argentina